György Bessenyei (1747–1811) was a Hungarian playwright and poet.

Works
 1772 – Ágis tragédiája 
 1777 – A magyar néző
 1777 – A filozófus
 1778 – Magyarság
 1779 – A holmi
 1781 – Egy magyar társaság iránt való jámbor szándék
 1799 – A természet világa
 1804 – Tarimenes utazása

Hungarian male dramatists and playwrights
18th-century Hungarian poets
Hungarian male poets
1747 births
1811 deaths